Harasgama is a suburb of Matale,  Sri Lanka.

See also
List of towns in Central Province, Sri Lanka

External links

Populated places in Matale District